Phania speculifrons is a species of fly in the family Tachinidae.

Distribution and habitat
This species is present in parts of Europe: Austria, Belgium, Bulgaria, Czech Republic, France, Germany, Hungary, Italy, Romania, Slovakia, the Netherlands, Ukraine and former Yugoslavia.

Description
These flies have a shiny, greyish abdomen. The ad apical spur of the fore tibia is longer than the dorsal one. In males, tergites 2 - 4, in females tergites 2 and 3 are dusted almost to the posterior edge.

Biology
Phania speculifrons is a univoltine species. Adults fly from mid June to July–August, feeding on flowers. Hosts of this parasitic species are unknown.

References

Bibliography
Ebrahim Gilasian, Ali Asghar Talebi, Joachim Ziegler & Shahab Manzari (2013): A review of the genus Phania Meigen, 1824 (Diptera: Tachinidae: Phasiinae) in Iran with the description of a new species, Zoology and Ecology, DOI:10.1080/21658005.2013.765174

Phasiinae
Diptera of Europe
Tachinidae genera
Insects described in 1919